Shotesham-Woodton Hornbeam Woods is a  biological Site of Special Scientific Interest east of Newton Flotman in Norfolk.

This site is composed of four ancient coppice with standards hornbeam woods on boulder clay, Shotesham Little Wood, Saxlingham Grove, Hempnall Little Wood and Winter's Grove. The ground flora is rich with several uncommon species, such as herb paris, stinking iris and greater butterfly orchid.

The woods are private with no public access.

References

Sites of Special Scientific Interest in Norfolk
Shotesham